Comanthera elegans is a species of flowering plants found in Minas Gerais, Brazil.

References

External links

Eriocaulaceae
Flora of Brazil
Plants described in 2010